Oreophryne clamata is a species of frog in the family Microhylidae. It is endemic to West Papua, Indonesia, and known from the Wondiwoi Mountains at the base of the Wandammen Peninsula, Papua province. The specific name clamata, meaning "makes a loud noise", refers to its striking advertisement call. Common name noisy cross frog has been proposed for this species.

Description
Dorsum is yellowish-brownish with some conspicuous black spots. There is a whitish crossbar between the eyes. Some individuals have a broad, whitish vertebral stripe. Belly and throat grey marbled with dark brown. Tympanum is scarcely visible. Fingers have large discs; toes have smaller discs. Both fingers and toes are unwebbed.

Males start calling shortly after dark. The call is a loud rattle, with males responding to each other's calls.

Habitat and conservation
Natural habitat of Oreophryne clamata is tropical rainforest with patchy, dense undergrowth at elevations of  asl. They are hard to find as males are small and typically perch on half-curled leaves 1–3 metres above the ground.

Threats to it are unknown, although logging might be a threat. Its range might include the Wondiwoi Nature Reserve.

References

clamata
Amphibians of Western New Guinea
Endemic fauna of New Guinea
Endemic fauna of Indonesia
Amphibians described in 2003
Taxa named by Rainer Günther
Taxonomy articles created by Polbot